The women's 200 metre breaststroke event, included in the swimming competition at the 1968 Summer Olympics, took place on October 22–23, at the Alberca Olímpica Francisco Márquez. In this event, swimmers covered four lengths of the 50-metre (160 ft) Olympic-sized pool employing the breaststroke. It was the tenth appearance of the event, which first appeared at the 1924 Summer Olympics in Paris. A total of 31 competitors from 20 nations participated in the event. American Catie Ball was the large favourite to win the event, as she had broken the world record in this event the last three times. However, she was suffering from a virus infection and was forced to withdraw from the heats. Her 16-year-old teammate Sharon Wichman won the event, breaking bronze medalist Galina Prozumenshchikova's Olympic record in the final.

Records
Prior to this competition, the existing world and Olympic records were:

The following records were established during the competition:

Results

Heats

Final

Sources

References

Women's breaststroke 200 metre
1968 in women's swimming
Women's events at the 1968 Summer Olympics